Loudblast is a French death/thrash metal band from Villeneuve-d'Ascq that pioneered the genres in France, and one of the most important French metal bands of the 1990s.

History
The band began in 1986 in the northern city of Lille. Its first recording was a split CD with the Nice-based band Agressor. They have released seven albums on the record labels Semetary/Fnac, Metal13, and Listenable. They began playing thrash metal influenced by the classic American bands such as Slayer. In 1991, they recorded the album "Disincarnate" in Morrisound Recording studios in Tampa, Florida, and the result was a pure death metal album. In the late 1990s, they incorporated more melody and groove in their music while maintaining a thrash/death aesthetic.

The band announced that they were splitting in 1999, but after a support concert to Death's late frontman Chuck Schuldiner in 2000, the band reformed with Agressor's Alex Colin-Tocquaine and released Planet Pandemonium in 2002. After a few years hiatus, Stéphane and Hervé announced in November 2009 a new line-up including Alex Lenormand (Locust) and Drakhian (Fornication, Black Dementia, Griffar).

In February 2017, Jérôme Point-Canovas replaced Drakhian as the band's guitarist during the "Sublime Dementia Tour", and he was officialised as permanent member in May.

The band's latest album, Manifesto, was released on November 6, 2020.

Members

Current members
 Stéphane Buriez – vocals, guitar (1985–1999, 2000, 2002–present)
 Hervé Coquerel – drums (1992–1999, 2000, 2002–present)
 Frédéric Leclercq – bass (2016–present)
 Jérôme Point-Canovas – guitar (2017–present)

Past members
 Nicolas Leclercq – guitar (1985–1999)
 Joris Terrier – drums (1985–1990)
 Patrick Evrard – bass (1985–1986)
 François Jamin – bass (1986–1999, 2000, 2002–2003)
 Thierry Pinck – drums (1990–1992)
 Stephane Jobert – guitar (1994–1995)
 Alex Colin-Tocquaine – guitar (2002–2007)
 Alex Lenormand – bass (2003–2016)
 Drakhian – guitar (2008–2017)

Timeline

Discography

Albums studio 
 1989 : 
 1991 : 
 1993 : 
 1998 : 
 2004 : 
 2011 : 
 2014 : 
 2020 :

Demos 
 1985 : 
 1986 : 
 1987 : 
 1988 : 
 1989 : 
 1995 :

Split 
 1987 : , split-cd (with Agressor)
 1993 : , EP
 2000 : , compilation album

Live 
 unknown Date : *, VHS, année inconnue)
 1993 : , VHS
 1994 : , VHS
 1997 : 
 1998 : 
 1999 : , VHS
 2009 : , CD +DVD
 2017 : , DVD

References

 https://www.rockhard.de/band/loudblast_77667.html
 https://www.metal.de/bands/loudblast-99153/

External links
 Loudblast Official Website
 MySpace

Musical groups from Hauts-de-France
French thrash metal musical groups
French death metal musical groups
Musical groups established in 1986
Musical quartets
1986 establishments in France